Văsieni may refer to:

 Văsieni, Ialoveni, a commune in Ialoveni district, Moldova
 Văsieni, Teleneşti, a commune in Teleneşti district, Moldova